DragonDictate, Dragon Dictate, or Dragon for Mac is proprietary speech recognition software.  The older program, DragonDictate, was originally developed by Dragon Systems for Microsoft Windows. It has now been replaced by Dragon NaturallySpeaking for Windows, and has since been acquired by Nuance Communications.  Dragon Dictate for Mac 2.0 (originally named MacSpeech Dictate) is supported only on Mac OS X 10.6 (Snow Leopard).  Nuance's other products for Mac include MacSpeech Scribe.

Original DragonDictate
DragonDictate for Windows was the original speech recognition application from Dragon Systems and used discrete speech where the user must pause between speaking each word.  The first version, 1.0 was available only through a few distribution and support partners.  It included a Shure cardioid microphone headset.  Later it was replaced by Dragon NaturallySpeaking, which allows continuous speech recognition and correction and training of words via the keyboard.  NaturallySpeaking remains a Windows-only program, and since 2016 distributes in Version 15.  DragonDictate for Windows is still available but has not been updated since Windows 98 was the current operating system.

Dragon Dictate for Mac
Dragon Dictate for Mac 2.0, an upgrade for MacSpeech Dictate, was announced on September 20, 2010 by Nuance Communications, the developer of MacSpeech products.  The upgrade incorporates some of the features of NaturallySpeaking into the MacSpeech software. Dragon Dictate for Mac lacks other NaturallySpeaking features, such as training mis-recognized words by simply re-typing them using the keyboard.  An early review by David Pogue notes,

In October 2018 Nuance announced that it was dropping Macintosh support for its products.

See also
List of speech recognition software

Notable users
Peter David - American writer of comic books, novels, television, movies and video games. David began using DragonDictate following his stroke in December 2012.

References

External links
 for Nuance Communications

Speech recognition software